The Monseigneur Schrijnen Retreat House was designed by the famed architect Frits Peutz (best known for the Glaspaleis) in 1932, and named after the 18th bishop of Roermond Laurentius Josephus Antonius Hubertus Schrijnen (Venlo 30 July 1861 - Roermond 26 March 1932). It is located at the top of one of the steepest hills in Heerlen next to the Molenberg and surrounded by the Aambos (a forest). It is one of the biggest buildings designed by Peutz.

Uses
1933-1961 Retreat House for girls
1961-1966 Philosophicum
1966-1999 First Hogeschool voor Theologie en Pastoraat (Highschool for theology and Pastorate) and later Universiteit voor Theologie en Pastoraat (University for theology and Pastorate).
1999 – now home to AGS Architekten & Planners, the successor of the Peutz office

External links
Website
 https://nhadepso.com
 http://nhadepdanang.com.vn
 https://59sdesign.com

Rijksmonuments in Heerlen
Architecture in the Netherlands
Buildings and structures completed in 1933